This is a list of members of the Tasmanian House of Assembly between the 1871 elections and the 1872 elections.

Notes 

  In January 1872, John Balfe, the member for West Hobart, resigned. James Gray won the resulting by-election on 6 February 1872.
  In March 1872, Basil Archer, the member for Ringwood, resigned. Frederick Houghton won the resulting by-election on 25 April 1872.
  In May 1872, Charles Rocher, the member for North Launceston, resigned. James Cox won the resulting by-election on 28 June 1872.
  On 11 June 1872, John Davies, the member for Franklin, died. Russell Young was elected unopposed on 4 July 1872.

Sources
 
 Parliament of Tasmania (2006). The Parliament of Tasmania from 1856

Members of Tasmanian parliaments by term
19th-century Australian politicians